Bo Saw Aung (born as  Ko Ngwe, 28 April 1914 in Shan State) was a military officer and a member of the legendary "Thirty Comrades" who trained in Japan in the struggle for independence from Britain. He was the first of Thirty Comrades to be killed.

He served in the Burmese National Army (BIA) and participated to fought for the liberation of Burma from British rule.

Early life and careers

On 28 April 1914, he was born in Shansu Village, Kamayut Township, Yangon . His birth name was Ko Ngwe. His younger brother was Bo Saw Naung, one of Thirty Comrades.

In 1934, he joined the Dobama Asiayone and became involved in politics. When he joined it, he took his name as Thakin Ngwe. In 1938, when the  Dobama Asiayone split into two factions, he joined the  Ba Sein – Tun Oke faction. He was selected to be sent to Japan for military training and received military training in Hainan and Taiwan.

Along with the Burmese Independence Army (BIA), which he included, he fought valiantly against British troops. At 26 February 1942, Saw Aung was killed during an attack on a British military base in Shwegyin.

Death

Bo Saw Aung died in Shwegyin on February 26, 1942.

References

Burmese military personnel of World War II
20th-century Burmese businesspeople
Government ministers of Myanmar
Burmese collaborators with Imperial Japan
1914 births
1942 deaths
People from Yangon Region
Military personnel killed in World War II